Brian Hill (6 October 1937 – 5 April 1968) was an English professional footballer who played as a full back.

Career 
Born in Sheffield, Hill began his career at Sheffield Wednesday, where he made 117 appearances in the Football League for them between 1956 and 1967. He also made 2 FA Cup and 3 European appearances for the club. He later played in Belgium for Club Brugge, making 11 league and 2 European appearances for them.

Death 
Hill died of a heart attack on 5 April 1968.

References 

1937 births
1968 deaths
English footballers
English expatriate footballers
Sheffield Wednesday F.C. players
Club Brugge KV players
English Football League players
Belgian Pro League players
English expatriate sportspeople in Belgium
Expatriate footballers in Belgium
Association football fullbacks